William or Bill Gillespie may refer to:

 William Gillespie (actor) (1894–1938), Scottish actor 
 William Gillespie (New Zealand politician) (1893–1961), New Zealand politician of the National Party
 William Ernest Gillespie (1912–1967), American educator
 William John Gillespie (1897–1967), Canadian World War I flying ace
 Willie Earl Gillespie (born 1961), American football wide receiver
 Bill Gillespie (journalist) (born 1946), Canadian journalist and author
 Bill Gillespie (politician) (1928–2008), American politician
 Bill Gillespie (footballer) (1887–1927), Australian rules footballer
 Bill Gillespie (rugby league) (1894–1945), Australian rugby league player
 Billie Gillespie (1873–1942), English footballer
 Billy Gillespie (1891–1981), Irish footballer
 William David Gillespie (born 1934), New Zealand rugby union player